Woods House may refer to:

Reid-Woods House, Sarasota, Florida, listed on the National Register of Historic Places
Mosely-Woods House, Yazoo City, Mississippi, listed on the National Register of Historic Places
John Woods House (Pittsburgh, Pennsylvania), listed on the National Register of Historic Places

See also
Wood House (disambiguation)